Night Slugs is an English electronic music record label, established in 2010 by Alex Sushon (also known as Bok Bok) and James Connolly (also known as L-Vis 1990).

History
Night Slugs was originally started as a London-based club night by DJs/producers Alex Sushon and James Connolly after the two met on Myspace in 2008. The first Night Slugs party was staged at the Redstar in Camberwell in March 2008, though the nights would eventually move to the more centrally located East Village.

After artists featured at the club nights remained unsigned, Sushon and Connolly founded Night Slugs as a record label in January 2010 with the release of Mosca’s Square One EP. That same year the label released their first compilation, Night Slugs Allstars Vol. 1.

Spin magazine described the label as having "developed one of the most distinctive sounds in U.K. dance music, a mutable hybrid of grime, house, electro, R&B, techno, hip-hop, and dubstep".

Artists 
Artists who have released music on Night Slugs include:

 Bok Bok
 Cubic Zirconia
 DAT Oven
 DJC
 Egyptrixx
 Girl Unit
 Helix
 Hysterics
 Jacques Greene
 Jam City
 Kingdom
 KW Griff
 Lil Silva
 L-Vis 1990
 MikeQ
 Morri$
 Mosca
 Neana
 Optimum
 Pearson Sound
 P Jam
 Sweyn Jupiter
 T. Williams
 Velour

See also
 List of record labels
 List of electronic music record labels

References

External links
 
 Night Slugs at Discogs

Electronic music record labels
Record labels established in 2010
British independent record labels